GT Road is a 2019 Pakistani family drama television series that originally aired on A-Plus Entertainment from 16 October 2019. It stars Asma Abbas, Khalid Butt, Inayat Khan, Sonia Mishal, Aijaz Aslam and Kashif Mehmood.

Plot 
It revolves around the residents of a housing society GT Road, help each other find solutions when they face common, real-life challenges and get involved in sticky situations but at the same time fights with each other on small little issues.

Cast 

 Sonia Mishal as Nageena 
 Asma Abbas as Fatima
 Inayat Khan as Shuja
 Kashif Mehmood as Tufail
 Aijaz Aslam
 Aliha Chaudry as Kausar
 Khalid Butt as Ghulam Talib
 Memoona Qudoos as Feroza
 Maria Malik as Ayesha
 Sumbul Shahid as Nageena's mother

References 

2019 Pakistani television series debuts
Pakistani television series endings